Víctor Manuel Rebolledo González (born 6 June 1949) is a Chilean politician and lawyer who served as member of the Chamber of Deputies of Chile and also served as minister of State.

In 2013, Rebolledo was a pre-candidate for the Chamber of Deputies of Chile. Similarly, he was a candidate for a seat in the Constitutional Convention.

References

External links
 BCN Profile

1949 births
Living people
University of Chile alumni
Complutense University of Madrid alumni
20th-century Chilean politicians
21st-century Chilean politicians
Radical Party of Chile politicians
Party for Democracy (Chile) politicians
People from Illapel